Øivin Fjeldstad (2 May 1903 – 16 October 1983) was a Norwegian conductor and violinist.  Fjeldstad was artistic director and principal conductor of the Oslo Philharmonic from 1962 to 1969.

Biography
A native of Oslo, Øivin Fjeldstad debuted as a violinist in 1921 following musical instruction in the conservatories of Oslo Conservatory of Music under the direction Gustav Lange and University of Music and Theatre in Leipzig under instruction of  Walther Davisson.
Ten years later, having studied with Clemens Krauss in Berlin, he began his conducting career in Oslo and, after the end of World War II and the founding of the Norwegian Radio Orchestra (Kringkastingsorkestret) in 1946, he became its head conductor. Between 1958 and 1960, the Norwegian National Opera and Ballet had Kirsten Flagstad as its general manager and Øivin Fjeldstad as its first artistic director. In 1962 he, along with Herbert Blomstedt, succeeded Odd Grüner-Hegge as head conductor of Oslo Philharmonic, the nation's leading orchestra, becoming one of the most influential figures in his country's postwar musical history.

Personal life
He was awarded the King's Medal of Merit (Kongens fortjenstmedalje) in 1954 and was made a  Knight 1st Class in the Royal Norwegian Order of St. Olav during 1962.  In 1934 he married Julie Antoinette Skappel (1910–1996). Their daughter, Lise Fjeldstad, is a film and stage actress while his son Øivin Skappel Fjeldstad is a banker and  Member of the Storting. Øivin Fjeldstad died in 1983 and was buried at Vestre gravlund in Oslo.

References

External links
Catalog of Øivin Fjeldstad recordings

1903 births
1983 deaths
Musicians from Oslo
Norwegian conductors (music)
Male conductors (music)
Norwegian violinists
Male violinists
20th-century violinists
Recipients of the St. Olav's Medal
Recipients of the King's Medal of Merit
Burials at Vestre gravlund
20th-century conductors (music)
20th-century Norwegian male musicians